Samantha Cheverton (born August 11, 1988) is a Canadian competitive swimmer.  At the 2012 Summer Olympics in London, she competed for the national team in the women's 4x200-metre freestyle relay, finishing in 4th place in the final.  She was also part of the 4 x 100 m freestyle and 4 x 100 m medley teams.  She competed as an individual in the 200 m freestyle.

She was part of the Canadian 4 x 200 m team that won silver at the 2014 Commonwealth Games.

Cheverton attended Ohio State University in Columbus, Ohio, where she swam for the Ohio State Buckeyes swimming and diving team in National Collegiate Athletic Association (NCAA) and Big Ten Conference competition from 2008 to 2011.

References

1988 births
Living people
Anglophone Quebec people
Canadian female freestyle swimmers
Commonwealth Games medallists in swimming
Ohio State Buckeyes women's swimmers
Olympic swimmers of Canada
Swimmers from Montreal
Swimmers at the 2012 Summer Olympics
Swimmers at the 2014 Commonwealth Games
Commonwealth Games silver medallists for Canada
Medallists at the 2014 Commonwealth Games